Frič is a Czechized German surname. Notable people with the surname include:

 Alberto Vojtěch Frič, Czech botanist
 Antonín Jan Frič (Fritsch), Czech paleontologist
 Jaroslav Erik Frič, Czech poet
 Martin Frič, Czech film director, screenwriter and actor

See also 
 Fričovce

Czech-language surnames